Tateos Artemjevich Agekian (12 May 1913, Batumi – 16 January 2006, Saint Petersburg) was a Soviet astrophysicist of Armenian descent, and one of the pioneers of Russian and world Stellar dynamics. Has found two evolutionary sequences of stellar systems: nearly spherical and strongly flattened. Suggested essentially new method to investigate the structure and kinematics of the Milky Way Galaxy. Found a new estimate for the dissipation rate in stellar clusters. Gave an exhaustive analysis of the photogravitational interaction between stars and gas clouds. A planet (3862, "Agekian") was named in honor of Tateos Artemjevich.

Biography
T. A. Agekian was born to an Armenian family in Batum in 1913. After graduating from the Leningrad University, in 1938, he began to work as a school teacher. After some years he began his post-graduate studies, but was interrupted because of the Great Patriotic War. T. A. Agekian participated in the war as a Chief of Staff of an artillery regiment. After the demobilization, T. A. Agekian returned to the Leningrad University and worked at the Department of Stellar Astronomy. He received the degree of Candidate of Physical and Mathematical Sciences in 1947. In 1960, he became a Doctor of Physical and Mathematical Sciences and later he received the title of Professor. At present, Professor T. A. Agekian is the Head of Laboratory of Stellar Dynamics and Celestial Mechanics of the Astronomical Institute of St. Petersburg University. He died on January 16, 2006, in Saint Petersburg

Scientific activity

Cluster parameters
The most of his work are connected with applying the methods of mathematical statistics and theory of random processes to stellar astronomy. In particular, studying the results of star and galaxy counts, he was able to separate the effects of real clustering and the effects due to a clumpy structure of the absorbing layer and to estimate the cluster parameters.

Stellar encounters and stellar clusters
Developing the theory of stellar encounters, T. A. Agekian has found the probability of encounters with a given velocity change and studied the effect of the encounter multiplicity. These results gave him a possibility to find a new estimate for the dissipation rate in stellar clusters.

Evolution of rotating systems
In the studies of the influence of the stellar evaporation on the evolution of rotating systems, T. A. Agekian has discovered the existence of two evolutionary subsystems: the spherical and the flattened ones.

Photogravitational interaction
Agekian gave an exhaustive analysis of the photogravitational interaction between stars and gas clouds. The results obtained provide a possible explanation for the phenomenon of the stellar velocity increase with age.

Other scientific achievements
T. A. Agekian has initiated a numerical study of triple systems and a statistical analysis of results. Among other results, T. A. Agekian and his collaborators found the probabilities of capture and exchange. A classification of the states of triple systems was proposed. T. A. Agekian also studied the problem of motion in the field of an axially symmetrical potential, and being an author of new methods, achieved some new results in this difficult topic. Professor T. A. Agekian is one of the pioneers of Stellar Dynamics.

Since the 1970s, T. A. Agekian studied mainly the problem of motion in the field of an axially symmetrical potential. He proposed new methods and achieved some new results in the topic.

References 

1913 births
2006 deaths
People from Batumi
People from Batum Oblast
Soviet astronomers
Astronomers from Georgia (country)
Armenian astronomers
Saint Petersburg State University alumni
Academic staff of Saint Petersburg State University
Soviet military personnel of World War II
Georgian people of Armenian descent
Soviet Armenians